California State Fairgrounds Race Track has been the name of two dirt oval racing tracks located in Sacramento, California.  The track was built in 1906 for horse racing on the site of the California Exposition.  It was active for auto racing in 1907, 1912, and from 1946 until 1970.  The Exposition moved to a new site north of Downtown Sacramento in 1968, and the old fairgrounds were closed and sold for development in 1970.  The final day of the track was marred by tragedy when three drivers were killed in the 100-lap super-modified caged sprint car competition.

From 1949 to 1970, the track hosted the Golden State 100, a round of the AAA/USAC National Championship.  The race was revived at the new Cal Expo site as a USAC Silver Crown race from 1989 until 2000.  Motorcycle racing's Sacramento Mile continues to be held at the new California Exposition as part of the AMA Grand National Championship.

A 2.1-mile (3.4-km) road course was laid out in the parking lots surrounding the oval, and used for sports car racing between 1955 and 1969.  It hosted a SCCA National Sports Car Championship round in 1955.

Golden State 100 winners

The race was revived in 1989 at the new Cal Expo mile track as a USAC Silver Crown event.

References

Motorsport venues in California
Defunct motorsport venues in the United States
Defunct horse racing venues in California